LWM could refer to:

 Lawrence Municipal Airport (Massachusetts), US, IATA code
 Llantwit Major railway station, Wales, station code
 Louw Wepener Medal, South Africa